The Shasta Cascade region of California is in the northeastern and north-central sections of the state bordering Oregon and Nevada, including far northern parts of the Central Valley and the Sierra Nevada mountain range. The area is centered on Mount Shasta in the California Cascade Range, near the Trinity Alps. Counties included in the Shasta Cascade region include Butte, Lassen, Modoc, Plumas, Shasta, Siskiyou, Tehama and Trinity.

This is a list of museums, defined for this context as institutions (including nonprofit organizations, government entities, and private businesses) that collect and care for objects of cultural, artistic, scientific, or historical interest and make their collections or related exhibits available for public viewing. Also included are non-profit and university art galleries. Museums that exist only in cyberspace (i.e., virtual museums) are not included.

To use the sortable tables: click on the icons at the top of each column to sort that column in alphabetical order; click again for reverse alphabetical order.

Museums

Defunct museums
 South Shasta Model Railroad, Gerber

References

External links

 California State Association of Counties (CSAC)

Shasta
 
Buildings and structures in Lassen County, California
 
 
 
Museums in Siskiyou County, California